Robert Hills (September 1813 – 25 July 1884) was an English cricketer active in the late 1830s. Born at Ash-Next-Ridley, Kent, he was a batsman and bowler of unknown handedness who made seven known appearances in first-class cricket.

Hills made his first-class debut for Kent against Sussex in 1836 at the Old County Ground, Town Malling. He made a further appearance in 1836 in a return fixture between the sides at Brighton, before making five further first-class appearances in 1837. In seven first-class matches for Kent he scored 51 runs at an average of 5.66, with a top-score of 14 not out. As a bowler he took 13 wickets, though due to incomplete records, his bowling average is not known, but it is known the most wickets he took in a single innings was three.

He died at Gravesend, Kent on 25 July 1884.

References

External links

1813 births
1884 deaths
People from Sevenoaks District
English cricketers
Kent cricketers